Power Talk is a live album by American pianist Joanne Brackeen recorded in New Orleans in 1994 and released on the Turnipseed label.

Reception 

AllMusic reviewer Ken Dryden stated "Joanne Brackeen's concert at the Contemporary Art Center may not have gotten wide distribution and exposure, but it is one of her best releases. With a capable rhythm section including bassist Ira Coleman and drummer Tony Reedus, she gives an audience their money's worth and more".

Track listing 
All compositions by Joanne Brackeen except where noted.
 "There Is No Greater Love" (Isham Jones, Marty Symes) – 8:17
 "Picasso" – 12:37
 "My Funny Valentine" (Richard Rodgers, Lorenz Hart) – 10:24
 "Just One of Those Things" (Cole Porter) – 8:05
 "Darn That Dream" (Jimmy Van Heusen, Eddie DeLange) – 6:04
 "Caravan" (Juan Tizol, Duke Ellington, Irving Mills) – 9:15
 "Power Talk" – 9:29
 "Cosmic Ties and Mud Pies" – 2:37

Personnel 
Joanne Brackeen – piano
Ira Coleman – bass
Tony Reedus – drums

References 

Joanne Brackeen live albums
1994 live albums